The Blue Ridge League was the name of two minor league baseball organizations that operated in the first half of the twentieth century in the United States.

History

The first league operated for the better part of sixteen years, from 1915 through 1918, and 1920 to 1930. It was a Class D level league in the old classification system that ran from Class D up to Class Double-A, and had teams from Maryland, Pennsylvania and West Virginia.

The league was founded by Charles W. Boyer in 1915, as part of the National Association of Professional Baseball Leagues. Boyer, former president of the original South Atlantic League, served as the league president in the Blue Ridge League's inaugural season. Due to internal problems, Boyer resigned as president the first week of the 1916 season, being replaced by James Vincent Jamison Jr. Jamison was at the forefront of the league until it ceased its operations shortly before the beginning of the 1931 season.

Blue Ridge League play officially began in 1915 with six teams from Chambersburg, Frederick, Gettysburg, Hagerstown, Hanover and Martinsburg. The team to win the most games during the regular season was declared the pennant winner. Through the 1917 midseason, Chambersburg replaced Cumberland when this team refused to pay its annual forfeit fee. The league shrank from six teams to four in 1918, with teams representing Cumberland, Hagerstown, Martinsburg and Piedmont, and ultimately disbanded after three weeks of play due to the lack of players during World War I.

Due to the aftermath of the war and the 1918 flu pandemic, the Blue Ridge League did not resume operations until 1920, with Chambersburg, Frederick, Hagerstown, Hanover and Martinsburg rejoining the action, as well as the addition of the Waynesboro franchise to bring again the six-team format. Since 1928, the two teams with the best records competed in a series of play-off games to determine the League Champion. Gradually, six Major League Baseball franchises started their affiliation with the league, among others Cleveland Indians (Frederick), Detroit Tigers (Hanover), New York Yankees (Chambersburg), St. Louis Cardinals (Waynesboro) and Philadelphia Athletics (Martinsburg), Washington Senators (Hagerstown). But after the Wall Street Crash of 1929, Detroit and St. Louis dropped their affiliations due to heavy financial losses. Only the teams of Chambersburg, Frederick, Hagerstown and Waynesboro returned in 1930, the Blue Ridge League's last season.

Cities/Teams/Years

Championship teams
1915 Frederick Hustlers 
1916 Chambersburg Maroons 
1917 Hagerstown Terriers 
1918 Cumberland Colts
1919 Season suspended
1920 Hagerstown Champs 
1921 Frederick Hustlers 
1922 Martinsburg Blue Sox 
1923 Martinsburg Blue Sox 
1924 Martinsburg Blue Sox 
1925 Hagerstown Hubs
1926 Hagerstown Hubs 
1927 Chambersburg Maroons 
1928 Hanover Raiders
1929 Hagerstown Hubs 
1930 Chambersburg Young Yanks

Season records

Hitting
Games: 118, Richard Zorman, Hanover (1929)  118, Dan Tapson, Hanover (1929)
Batting Average: .404, Roger "Doc" Cramer, Martinsburg (1929)
At Bats: 466, Babe Phelps, Hagerstown (1930)
Runs: 104, George Rawlings, Martinsburg (1923)
Hits: 175, Babe Phelps, Hagerstown (1930)
Doubles: 41, Holmes Diehl, Hagerstown (1925)
Triples: 24, Joe Vosmik, Frederick (1929)
Home Runs: 30, Hack Wilson, Martinsburg (1922)
Extra Base Hits: 62, Babe Phelps, Hagerstown (1930)  62, John Vosmik, Frederick (1929)
Total Bases: 300, Babe Phelps, Hagerstown (1930)
Sacrifices: 39, John Boyle, Hagerstown, (1925)
Stolen Bases: 47, Walter Kimmick, Waynesboro (1921)
Walks: 100, George Scheiminant, Hagerstown (1925)
Struck Out: 77, Louis Allen, Hanover (1928)

Pitching
Games: 39, Frank Fraley, Frederick (1929)
Complete Games: 22, Frank Ulrich, Waynesboro (1923)
Wins: 25, Earl Howard, Hagerstown (1917)  25, Alan Clarke, Waynesboro (1921)
Losses: 17, Stephen Woodgie, Chambersburg (1922)
Best Percentage: .889 (16-2), Lester Shatzer, Chambersburg (1927)
Innings Pitched: 274, Alan Clarke, Waynesboro (1921)
Win Streak: 8, Abe Welcher, Hagerstown (1915)
Strikeouts: 258, Alan Clarke, Waynesboro (1921)
Hit Batsmen: 29, Alan Clarke, Waynesboro (1921)
Bases on Balls: 163, Joe Zubris, Hagerstown (1925)

No-Hitters

Second League
Another Blue Ridge League operated between 1946 and 1950. It was located in North Carolina and Virginia and was rated as a D-level league. The Presidents in the history of the league were Joe Ryan (1946), Stanley F. Radke (1947-'48), Judge E. C. Bivins (1948-'49) and John B. Spiers (1950). In 1946, the team with the best winning record was declared the pennant winner. From 1947 through 1950, the two teams with the best records faced in a series of play-off games to determine the League Champion.

Cities/Teams/Years

Championship teams
1946 Salem Friends/Lenoir Red Sox #
1947 Galax Leafs
1948 Galax Leafs
1949 Mount Airy Graniteers
1950 Elkin Blanketeers
 Salem moved to Lenoir in the midseason

References

Sources
Minor League Baseball Standings: All North American Leagues, through 1999 – Benjamin Barrett Sumner. Publisher: McFarland & Company, 2000. Format: Hardcover, 726pp. Language: English. 
Encyclopedia of Minor League Baseball: The Official Record of Minor League Baseball – Lloyd Johnson, Miles Wolff, Steve McDonald. Publisher: Baseball America, 1997. Format: Paperback, 672pp. Language: English. 
The Blue Ridge League: Images of Baseball – Robert B. Savitt.  Publisher: Arcadia Publishing, 2011. Format: Softcover, 127pp. Language: English.

External links
Class D, Blue Ridge League (1915-1930) Website
Baseball Reference - Blue Ridge League History

1915 establishments in the United States
1930 disestablishments in the United States
Sports leagues established in 1946
1950 disestablishments in the United States
Defunct minor baseball leagues in the United States
Baseball leagues in Pennsylvania
Baseball leagues in Maryland
Baseball leagues in West Virginia
Baseball leagues in North Carolina